Carlin Canyon is a steep-sided canyon carved by the Humboldt River in southwestern Elko County, Nevada, United States. The California Trail, First transcontinental railroad and Victory Highway have all passed through the canyon in the past.  At present, Interstate 80 and the Union Pacific Railroad both traverse the canyon, though both bypass a sharp loop in the canyon via the Carlin Tunnel.

References

Interstate 80
Landforms of Elko County, Nevada
Canyons and gorges of Nevada